The 2007 Cambridge City Council election took place on 3 May 2007 to elect members of Cambridge City Council in England. This was on the same day as other nationwide local elections.

Results summary

Ward results

Abbey

Arbury

Castle

Cherry Hinton

Coleridge

East Chesterton

King's Hedges

Market

Newnham

Petersfield

Queen's Edith

Romsey

Trumpington

West Chesterton

References

Cambridge
2007
2000s in Cambridge